Yttrium(III) sulfide (Y2S3) is an inorganic chemical compound. It is a compound of yttrium and sulfur.

References

Sulfides
Yttrium compounds